Sterrett, Sterett  or Sterret may refer to:

Places 
 Sterrett, Alabama

People 
 Andrew Sterett (1787–1807), United States Navy officer
 Cliff Sterrett (1883–1964), American cartoonist
 Dutch Sterrett (Charles Hurlbut Sterrett) (1889–1965), American professional baseball player
 Eva Sterrett (born 1998), storyboard artist and YouTube animator
 J. Macbride Sterrett (1847–1923), American psychologist.
 John Robert Sitlington Sterrett (1851–1914), American classical scholar and archeologist
 Joseph Edmund Sterrett (1870–1934), American accountant
 Samuel Sterett (1758–1833), American politician
 Virginia Frances Sterrett (1900–1931), American artist and illustrator

Ships 
 , the name of more than one United States Navy ship